The Sehol X4 or previously the JAC Jiayue X4 is a compact crossover produced by JAC Motors under the Sehol brand. The Sehol X4 was briefly called the Sol X4 and JAC Jiayue X4 before the Sehol brand name was established. The Sehol X4 is essentially an extensive facelift of the previously launched JAC Refine S4.

Overview

The X4 was launched on the Mainland Chinese market in June 2020 as a modernized variant of the JAC Refine S4 and remains available there. In Brazil, however, in December 2020 the vehicle replaced the S4, which was marketed there as the T60. The X4 is sold there as the JAC T60 Plus. The battery-powered Sol E40X from the Sol brand was presented at the Chengdu Auto Show in July 2020. The Sol brand was later renamed to Sehol. It has been on sale in China since January 2021.

Powertrain
The X4 is powered by the 1.5-liter petrol engine familiar from the S4. The vehicle is only offered with front-wheel drive. The X4 has a 6-speed manual transmission as standard, a continuously variable transmission is available at an additional cost.

Sehol E40X (electric variant)
The E40X has an accumulator with an energy content of 55 kWh or 66 kWh.

Moskvitch 3
On November 23, 2022, the factory began SKD assembly of the Moskvitch 3, and on December 26, 2022, it went on sale in Russia alongside the electric version.

References

External links
Official website

Jiayue X4
Compact sport utility vehicles
Front-wheel-drive vehicles
Cars introduced in 2020
Production electric cars
Electric vehicles